East Hills railway station is located on the East Hills line, serving the Sydney suburb of East Hills. It is served by Sydney Trains T8 Airport & South line services.

History

East Hills station opened on 21 December 1931 when the line was extended from Kingsgrove. It served as the terminus of the line until it was extended to Glenfield on 21 December 1987.

A new station was built south-east of the original station as part of the extension opening in August 1987 with the original station closed and demolished. Following the extension, East Hills became the main intermediate terminus and an interchange point between all stops and limited stops trains. In addition to the two through tracks (platforms 2 and 3), a side terminating track (platform 1) was provided. A new centre turnback at Revesby opened in 2009 as part of the Rail Clearways Program, which ended East Hills' role as the primary intermediate terminus.

Platforms & services

An 8-car Tangara service may operate sometimes on Saturdays and Sundays. Usually, A & B set trains service the station, however, there may be the occasional M, T or K set train will operate.

Transport links
Transdev NSW operate four routes to and from East Hills station:
922: to Bankstown Central via Milperra
924: to Bankstown Central via Revesby
925: to Lidcombe station
962: to Miranda

East Hills station is served by one NightRide route:
N40: to Town Hall station

Trackplan

References

External links

East Hills station details Transport for New South Wales

City of Canterbury-Bankstown
Railway stations in Sydney
Railway stations in Australia opened in 1931
East Hills railway line